Psychopharmacology is the third album by Firewater, released on April 17, 2001 through Jetset Records.

Track listing

Personnel 
Firewater
Tod Ashley – vocals, bass guitar, Mellotron
Oren Kaplan – guitar
Tamir Muskat – drums, percussion
Paul Wallfisch – organ, piano
Additional musicians and production
Oren Bloedow – sitar on "Fell Off the Face of the Earth"
Danny Blume – slide guitar on "The Man With the Blurry Face", piano on "She's the Mistake"
Alex Cadvan – cello on "Black Box Recording"
Jennifer Charles – vocals on "Bad, Bad World"
Doug Henderson – mastering, engineering
Scott Hull – mastering
George Javori – drums on "Car Crash Collaborator"
Ori Kaplan – alto saxophone on "Car Crash Collaborator"
C. Kelley – piano on "She's the Mistake"
Sylvia Massy – mixing
Tim Otto – baritone saxophone and tenor saxophone on "Car Crash Collaborator"
Hahn Rowe – violin on "7th Avenue Static"
Jamey Staub – production, engineering, mixing

References

External links 
 

Firewater (band) albums
2001 albums
Jetset Records albums